Magdalena de Cao is a town in Northern Peru, capital of the district Magdalena de Cao of Ascope Province in the region La Libertad. This town is located some 56 km northwest of Trujillo city in the agricultural Chicama Valley.

See also
Paiján culture
Ascope Province
Chavimochic
Virú Valley
Virú
Moche valley

External links
Location of Magdalena de Cao by Wikimapia

References

  
 

Populated places in La Libertad Region